Gastón Rodrigo Pereiro López (born 11 June 1995) is a Uruguayan professional footballer who plays as an attacking midfielder for Nacional on loan from the Italian club Cagliari, and the Uruguay national team.

Club career

Pereiro grew from the youth system of Nacional. In April 2012, along with Diego Baldi, Leandro Otormín and Rodrigo Amaral, he traveled to England to participate in a ten-day training session at Liverpool.

On 28 January 2014, he made his official debut for Nacional in a Copa Libertadores match against Oriente Petrolero. Coach Gerardo Pelusso substituted him on in the 63rd minute replacing Carlos de Pena, they lost 1–0. Four days later, he scored his first goal in the 2–0 victory over Racing at the Estadio Centenario.

On 15 July 2015, Eredivisie side PSV Eindhoven confirmed the signing of Pereiro on a five-year deal. He was given the number 7 jersey, previously worn by Memphis Depay, and made his official debut in the Dutch Super Cup 2015, coming on as a substitute for Adam Maher. On 4 October 2015, Pereiro made his first start for PSV Eindhoven, scoring a brace in a 2–1 victory against arch-rival Ajax. Pereiro then scored his first hat-trick for the club on 27 October 2015, in a KNVB Cup fixture against Genemuiden.

He scored the first goal as PSV beat rivals Ajax 3–0 to clinch the 2017–18 Eredivisie title.

On 31 January 2020, he signed a 4.5-year contract with Italian club Cagliari. On 17 January 2023, Pereiro returned to Nacional on loan until the end of the 2022–23 season.

International career
Pereiro was called by Fabián Coito to play the 2015 South American Youth Football Championship. He played eight matches scoring five goals, helping Uruguay qualify for the 2015 FIFA U-20 World Cup. He was selected for the U-20 World Cup squad and in the first match he scored the winning goal against the final champion, Serbia.

He was called up to the full Uruguay squad in the autumn of 2017. He made his debut in a 0-0 draw against Poland at the Stadion Narodowy in Warsaw on 10 November 2017.

Career statistics

Club

International

International goals
Scores and results list Uruguay's goal tally first.

Honours
Nacional
 Uruguayan Primera División: 2014–15

PSV
 Eredivisie: 2015–16, 2017–18
 Johan Cruijff Shield: 2015, 2016

Individual
 Eredivisie Player of the Month: October 2017

References

External links
 

1995 births
Living people
Footballers from Montevideo
Association football midfielders
Uruguayan footballers
Uruguayan Primera División players
Eredivisie players
Serie A players
Serie B players
Uruguay youth international footballers
Uruguay under-20 international footballers
Club Nacional de Football players
2015 South American Youth Football Championship players
PSV Eindhoven players
Cagliari Calcio players
2019 Copa América players
Uruguayan expatriate footballers
Expatriate footballers in the Netherlands
Expatriate footballers in Italy
Uruguay international footballers